Mark Lowrey may refer to:

 Mark Perrin Lowrey (1828–1885), Southern Baptist preacher
 Mark Lowrey (cricketer) (born 1971), former English cricketer